Shubenka is a rural locality (a selo) and the administrative center of Shubensky Selsoviet of Zonalny District, Altai Krai, Russia. The population was 1,248 as of 2016. There are 24 streets.

Geography 
Shubenka is located on the banks of the Chemrovka and Shubinka Rivers, 19 km east of Zonalnoye (the district's administrative centre) by road. Staraya Chemrovka is the nearest rural locality.

Ethnicity 
The village is inhabited by Russians and others.

References 

Rural localities in Zonalny District